A list of films produced in Egypt in 1943. For an A-Z list of films currently on Wikipedia, see :Category:Egyptian films.

External links
 Egyptian films of 1943 at the Internet Movie Database
 Egyptian films of 1943 elCinema.com

Lists of Egyptian films by year
1943 in Egypt
Lists of 1943 films by country or language